Neurophyseta volcanalis is a moth in the family Crambidae. It was described by William Schaus in 1920. It is found in Mexico.

The wingspan is about 12 mm. The forewings are white with fine brown lines.

References

Moths described in 1920
Musotiminae